The 2012 All Stars Match was the third of the annual representative exhibition matches played between the Indigenous All Stars and the NRL All Stars team which was held on 4 February 2012 at the Gold Coast's Skilled Park.

Teams

1 - Cameron Smith was originally selected to play but withdrew due to injury. He was replaced by Aaron Payne.
2 - Tony Williams was originally selected to play but withdrew due to injury. He was replaced by Anthony Watmough.
3 - Ben Hornby was originally selected to play but withdrew due to injury. He was replaced by Nathan Fien.

Result

Women All Stars Teams

The second Women's and Indigenous Women's All Stars match was again held as a curtain-raiser to the men's fixture. Captained by Teresa Anderson, the Indigenous team included Bianca Ambrum, Tash Baggow (Mackay), Candice Clay (Newcastle), Natalie Gala (Bundaberg), Julie Young (Newcastle), Rebecca Young (Newcastle), try-scorers Sarah Sailor and Chloe Caldwell, and player of the match Naomi Bobongie (Proserpine). Renae Kunst captained the All Stars team.    

The full team line-ups were originally published by the Australian Women's Rugby League on a defunct website, however, the press release was copied onto and remains on available on a fan forum.

References

External links
NRL All Stars site

All Stars match
Rugby league on the Gold Coast, Queensland
NRL All Stars match